Mączniki may refer to the following places:
Mączniki, Gniezno County in Greater Poland Voivodeship (west-central Poland)
Mączniki, Ostrów Wielkopolski County in Greater Poland Voivodeship (west-central Poland)
Mączniki, Ostrzeszów County in Greater Poland Voivodeship (west-central Poland)
Mączniki, Środa Wielkopolska County in Greater Poland Voivodeship (west-central Poland)